Rasbora notura is a species of cyprinid fish in the genus Rasbora from the Terengganu River system in Malaysia.

References 

Rasboras
Freshwater fish of Malaysia
Taxa named by Maurice Kottelat
Fish described in 2005